The Van Lith VI was a one-off French-built light civil utility aircraft of the late 1950s.

Development and design

The Van Lith VI was a two/three seat light high-wing cabin monoplane of conventional wooden construction. The wing was a two-spar structure with plywood and fabric covering. The fuselage was of rectangular section with plywood cladding. The main undercarriage with fixed legs, wheels, brakes and tailwheel were adapted from those of the Stampe SV.4. The pilot and passengers were seated in tandem with an access door on each side hinging upward for entry and exit. The slotted ailerons could be drooped together to function as flaps. It was initially flown with a single fin, but this was replaced with twin fins.

Operational history

One example of the design was completed.  It was flown by the constructor from airfields at Toussus-le-Noble and Guyancourt near Paris. It was still registered to Jean Van Lith in 1964, and was active until at least 1967, but is no longer extant.

Specifications

Notes

References

 
 

1950s French civil utility aircraft
High-wing aircraft
Single-engined tractor aircraft
Aircraft first flown in 1959